Delivering is a 1993 short film by American filmmaker Todd Field (using his real name William), while a fellow at the AFI Conservatory. Adapted from the story of the same name by Andre Dubus, it is a dramatic piece that takes place on the day brothers Jimmy (Ian Bohen) and Chris (Justin Carmack) discover their mother has abandoned the family.

The film is notable as it was the first time Field adapted Dubus' work. The next would be his Academy Award-nominated feature debut, In the Bedroom, based on Dubus' short story, Killings. Years after Field's graduation from the AFI, Delivering continued to be screened in the classroom.

Cast
 Ian Bohen as Jimmy
 Justin Carmack as Chris
 Danni Wheeler as Dottie
 David Hayward as Dad

External links
 

1993 short films
1993 films
Films directed by Todd Field
American short films
1990s English-language films